The Outer Critics Circle Awards are presented annually for theatrical achievements both on Broadway and Off-Broadway. They are presented by the Outer Critics Circle (OCC), the official organization of New York theater writers for out-of-town newspapers, digital and national publications, and other media beyond Broadway. The awards were first presented during the 1949–50 theater season, celebrating their 70th anniversary in 2020. David Gordon, Senior Features Reporter at TheaterMania.com, currently serves as president.

History
The Outer Critics Circle was founded as the Outer Circle during the Broadway season of 1949–50 by an assortment of theater critics led by John Gassner, a reviewer, essayist, dramaturg, and professor of theater. These critics were writing for academic publications, special interest journals, monthlies, quarterlies, and weekly publications outside the New York metro area, and were looking for a forum where they could discuss the theater in general, particularly the current New York season. The creation of the OCC was also a reaction to the New York Drama Critics Circle, which did not allow critics of lesser-known publications to join their ranks alongside writers of major New York and national publications. The first awards (for 1949–50) were: The Cocktail Party (Play); The Consul (Musical); Sheila Guyse, Performances in Supporting Roles for Lost in the Stars, and Daniel Reed, Performances in Supporting Roles for Come Back, Little Sheba.

In the early 1960s, the awards and forums of the OCC were supervised by Broadway veteran Charles K. Freeman and Joseph Kay, Manhattan reporter/critic for the Kansas City Star. This team was succeeded by Marjorie Gunner, who guided the group for 25 years before retiring in 2004.  Simon Saltzman, a New Jersey-based theater critic, served as President until 2018, when he was succeeded by David Gordon of TheaterMania.

In addition to Gordon (president) and Saltzman (now Vice President), the Board of Directors currently includes Joseph Cervelli (Recording Secretary), Patrick Hoffman (Corresponding Secretary), David Roberts (treasurer), Harry Haun (Historian), Cynthia Allen (Web Editor), Richard Ridge (Member), Janice Simpson (Member), and Stanley L. Cohen (advisor).

The reigning OCC Award winners for the 2018–19 season include Hadestown (Musical), The Ferryman (Play), Girl From the North Country (Off-Broadway Musical), and White Noise (Off-Broadway Play).

Categories
Awards are currently given in the following categories:

Outstanding Broadway Play
Outstanding Broadway Musical
Outstanding Off-Broadway Play
Outstanding Off-Broadway Musical
Outstanding New Score
Outstanding Revival of a Play
Outstanding Revival of a Musical
Outstanding Actor in a Play
Outstanding Actress in a Play
Outstanding Actor in a Musical
Outstanding Actress in a Musical
Outstanding Featured Actor in a Play
Outstanding Featured Actress in a Play
Outstanding Featured Actor in a Musical
Outstanding Featured Actress in a Musical
Outstanding Solo Performance
Outstanding Direction of a Play
Outstanding Direction of a Musical
Outstanding Choreography
Outstanding Set Design
Outstanding Costume Design
Outstanding Lighting Design
Outstanding Projection Design
Outstanding Sound Design
Outstanding Orchestrations
John Gassner Award (presented for an American play, preferably by a new playwright)

Winners and nominees

2017–2018 season
The nominees included SpongeBob SquarePants – 11; Harry Potter and the Cursed Child – 10; My Fair Lady – 9; Mean Girls – 8; Angels in America, Carousel, and Once on This Island – 6; Three Tall Women – 5; Frozen and Prince of Broadway – 4; Farinelli and the King and Travesties – 3.

The award winners were announced on May 7, 2018. Multiple winners are: Harry Potter and the Cursed Child with six awards, including Outstanding New Broadway Play, and My Fair Lady with five awards, including Outstanding Revival of a Musical. SpongeBob SquarePants won the Outstanding New Broadway Musical, with two additional awards. Jocelyn Bioh, for School Girls; Or, The African Mean Girls Play won the 
John Gassner Award.

2016–2017 season
The nominees included Anastasia – 13; Hello, Dolly! – 10; The Band's Visit and Come from Away – 7; Groundhog Day – 5; A Bronx Tale – 4; Falsettos, Holiday Inn, and Natasha, Pierre & The Great Comet of 1812 – 3; and Miss Saigon, Sunset Boulevard – 1.

Multiple winners: Come from Away and Hello, Dolly! – 4; The Band's Visit and Natasha, Pierre & The Great Comet of 1812 – 2. The Outstanding New Broadway Musical was Come from Away, and the Outstanding New Broadway Play was Oslo; Outstanding Revival of a Play was Jitney and Outstanding Revival of a Musical was Hello, Dolly!. The John Gassner Award winner was Bess Wohl for Small Mouth Sounds.

2015–2016 season
The nominees included American Psycho and She Loves Me – 8; Bright Star and On Your Feet! – 7; Dear Evan Hansen – 6; Eclipsed, Lazarus, Long Day's Journey Into Night and Spring Awakening – 5; and The Humans, A View From the Bridge and Waitress – 4.

Multiple winners: She Loves Me – 4; Long Day’s Journey Into Night – 3. The Outstanding New Broadway Musical was Bright Star, and the Outstanding New Broadway Play was The Humans; Outstanding Revival of a Play was Long Day’s Journey Into Night and Outstanding Revival of a Musical was She Loves Me. The John Gassner Award winner was Marco Ramirez for The Royale.

2014–2015 season
The nominees included Something Rotten! – 12, On the Twentieth Century – 9, An American in Paris – 8, Wolf Hall – 7, It Shoulda Been You – 6, The Audience – 6, The Curious Incident of the Dog in the Night-Time – 6, Hamilton – 5, The Elephant Man – 5, The King and I – 5, The Visit – 5, On The Town – 4, You Can't Take It with You – 4, The Heidi Chronicles – 3 and The Last Ship – 3.Multiple winners: The Curious Incident of the Dog in the Night-Time (5, including Outstanding New Broadway Play), An American in Paris (3, including Outstanding New Broadway Musical), Hamilton (3, including Outstanding Off-Broadway Musical), The King and I (3), The Audience (2), On the 20th Century (2) and You Can't Take It With You (2).

The John Gassner Award winner was The Invisible Hand by Ayad Akhtar.

2013–2014 season
The nominees included 11 nominations for A Gentleman's Guide to Love and Murder, 8 nominations for the new musical Aladdin, and 7 nominations for the new musical Fun Home; the dramas Twelfth Night received 5 nominations, Act One 4 nominations, and All the Way 4 nominations. Winners of multiple awards were A Gentleman's Guide to Love and Murder (including New Musical) with 4; Bullets Over Broadway and The Glass Menagerie with 3 each; and All the Way (including New Play) and Hedwig and the Angry Inch with 2 each. Three plays tied for the John Glassner Award: Eric Dufault, Year of the Rooster; Madeleine George, The (Curious Case of the) Watson Intelligence; and Steven Levenson, The Unavoidable Disappearance of Tom Durnin.

2012–2013 season
The nominees included 11 nominations for the revival of the musical Pippin, nine nominations for Kinky Boots, eight nominations (each) for Chaplin: The Musical and Cinderella and six nominations (each) for Golden Boy and The Nance.

Winners include Vanya and Sonia and Masha and Spike as Outstanding New Broadway Play, Kinky Boots as Outstanding New Broadway Musical, My Name is Asher Lev as Outstanding New Off-Broadway Play and Here Lies Love as Outstanding New Off-Broadway Musical. Who's Afraid of Virginia Woolf was named Outstanding Revival of a Play and Pippin as Outstanding Revival of a Musical. My Name is Asher Lev by Aaron Posner received the John Gassner Award. The Special Achievement Award was presented to the Irish Repertory Theatre.

2011–2012 season
The nominees included nine nominations for the new musical Nice Work If You Can Get It, the most of any production, with the musicals Newsies and Once each receiving seven nominations and the revival of Follies receiving five. The Public Theater received an honorary award "on its 50th anniversary presenting free theatre at the Delacorte Theater in Central Park."

Winners include One Man, Two Guvnors as Outstanding New Broadway Play, Once as Outstanding New Broadway Musical, Sons of the Prophet by Stephen Karam as Outstanding New Off-Broadway Play, and Michael John LaChiusa's Queen of the Mist as Outstanding New Off-Broadway Musical. The Submission by Jeff Talbot received the John Gassner Award.

2010–2011 season
The nominees, announced on April 26, 2011, included nine nominations for the musical Sister Act, the most of any show. Anything Goes received eight nominations. The Special Achievement Awards were also announced: Ellen Barkin, Outstanding Broadway Debut in The Normal Heart; and Adrian Kohler with Basil Jones for Handspring Puppet Company Puppet Design, Fabrication and Direction for War Horse.

Winners
Source: BroadwayWorld.com

Outstanding New Broadway Musical – The Book of Mormon (which also won Outstanding New Score)
Outstanding New Broadway Play – War HorseOutstanding New Off-Broadway Play – Other Desert Cities (by Jon Robin Baitz)
Outstanding New Off-Broadway Musical – The Kid (book by Michael Zam, music by Andy Monroe, lyrics by Jack Lechner)
Outstanding Revival of a Musical – Anything GoesOutstanding Revival of a Play – The Normal HeartOutstanding Director of a Musical – Casey Nicholaw and Trey Parker for Book of MormonOutstanding Director of a Play – Marianne Elliott and Tom Morris for War HorseOutstanding Choreographer – Kathleen Marshall for Anything GoesOutstanding Costume Design – Tim Chappel and Lizzy Gardiner for PriscillaOutstanding Lighting Design – Paule Constable for War HorseOutstanding Set Design – Neil Murray for Brief EncounterOutstanding Actress in a Musical – Sutton Foster
Outstanding Actor in a Musical – Josh Gad
Outstanding Actor in a Play – Mark Rylance
Outstanding Actress in a Play – Nina Arianda and Frances McDormand (TIE)
Outstanding Featured Actor in a Play – Brian Bedford
Outstanding Featured Actress in a Play – Elizabeth Rodriguez
Outstanding Featured Actress in a Musical – Laura Benanti
Outstanding Featured Actor in a Musical – Adam Godley

2009–2010 season
Nominees for the 2009–2010 season were announced on April 26, 2010, by siblings Sutton Foster and Hunter Foster, with winners announced on May 17. Seven nominations each were received by the musical Memphis and the revival of The Royal Family, the most of any production. The Scottsboro Boys was nominated for six awards, including Best Off-Broadway musical. Shows receiving five nominations were The Addams Family, Bloody Bloody Andrew Jackson, The Orphans' Home Cycle, and Promises, Promises. Finian's Rainbow, La Cage aux Folles, Lend Me A Tenor, and Sondheim on Sondheim each received four nominations.

The Outstanding New Broadway Musical award was won by Memphis, which won a total of four awards. Other winners included: Outstanding New Broadway Play for Red and Outstanding New Off-Broadway Play for The Orphans' Home Cycle, which won two awards. The Outstanding New Off-Broadway Musical was a tie, won by Bloody Bloody Andrew Jackson and The Scottsboro Boys. La Cage aux Folles won four awards: Outstanding Revival of a Musical, Outstanding Actor In A Musical (Douglas Hodge), Director (Terry Johnson), and Costume Design (Matthew Wright). Montego Glover (Memphis) and Catherine Zeta-Jones (A Little Night Music) tied for Outstanding Actress In A Musical.

2008–2009 seasonBilly Elliot the Musical and Shrek the Musical each received ten nominations, the most of any show. The winners were announced on May 11, 2009, with an awards dinner on May 21 at Sardi's Restaurant.Billy Elliot the Musical won seven awards, including Outstanding New Broadway Musical, followed by Shrek the Musical with four. The award for Outstanding Actress in a Musical was a tie between Sutton Foster and Josefina Scaglione. Brian d'Arcy James won for Outstanding Actor in a Musical. Outstanding New Broadway Play was won by God of Carnage.

The John Gassner Award (presented for an American play, preferably by a new playwright) was won by Gina Gionfriddo for Becky Shaw, and the Special Achievement Award was given to the three actors who share the role of Billy Elliot, David Alvarez, Trent Kowalik and Kiril Kulish in Billy Elliot the Musical''.

All winners and nominees
The complete list of winners and nominees is at the Outer Critics Official Site.

See also
Obie Awards
Tony Awards
Drama Desk Awards
Drama League Award
New York Drama Critics' Circle

References

External links
Outer Critics Circle Official site
List of 2007–08 winners/nominees at Playbill, May 12, 2008

American theater awards
Theatre in New York City
Awards established in 1950
1950 establishments in New York City
Awards for projection designers